Pardon My Rhythm is a 1944 movie starring Gloria Jean, Patric Knowles, and Evelyn Ankers, featuring Mel Tormé and Bob Crosby, and directed by Felix E. Feist.

Cast
Gloria Jean as Jinx Page
Patric Knowles as Tony Page
Evelyn Ankers as Julia Munson
Marjorie Weaver as Dixie Moore
Walter Catlett as O'Bannion
Mel Tormé as Ricky O'Bannon
Patsy O'Connor as Doodles
Ethel Griffies as Mrs. Dean
Jack Slattery as Announcer
Linda Reed as Soda Fountain Waitress
Alphonse Martell as Headwaiter
Bob Crosby as Orchestra Leader
James Floyd as Bully

Production
Universal announced the film in January 1944. It was an attempt for Universal to put Jean in an older role.

References

External links
Pardon My Rhythm at the Internet Movie Database

1944 films
Films directed by Felix E. Feist
American black-and-white films
Universal Pictures films
American romantic musical films
1940s romantic musical films
1940s English-language films
1940s American films